Gold Mine in the Sky is a 1938 Western film directed by Joseph Kane and starring Gene Autry, Smiley Burnette, and Carol Hughes. Based on a story by Betty Burbridge, the film is about a singing cowboy and ranch foreman who, as executor of the owner's will, must see that the daughter and heiress does not marry without his approval.

Plot
Gene Autry plays a singing ranch foreman who, as executor of the will of the property's owner, must ensure that Cody, the daughter/heiress (played by Hughes) doesn't marry without his approval. Cody wishes to marry Larry Cummings (Craig Reynolds), but Gene refuses, prompting Cummings to attempt to have Gene killed. When this fails, Cummings then demands money so Cody stages a fake kidnapping to raise the funds. However, her plan backfires after Cummings learns about it and turns it into a real kidnaping.

Cast
 Gene Autry as Gene Autry
 Smiley Burnette as Frog
 Carol Hughes as Cody Langham
 J.L. Franks' Golden West Cowboys as Musicians and Cowhands  
 Craig Reynolds as Larry Cummings
 Helen Ainsworth as Jane Crocker  
 LeRoy Mason as Red Kuzak  
 Frankie Marvin as Cowhand Joe
 Robert Homans as 'Lucky' Langham
 Eddie Cherkose as Sykes
 Ben Corbett as Spud Grogan
 Milburn Morante as Mugsy Malone
 Jim Corey as Henchman Chet
 George Guhl as Constable Cy
 Maudie Prickett as customer (uncredited)
 The Stafford Sisters as The Levinsky Trio
 Champion as Gene's Horse (uncredited)

Production

Stuntwork
 Nellie Walker
 Joe Yrigoyen

Filming locations
 Jack Garner Ranch
 Action Railway Depot
 Keen Camp, State Highway 74, Mountain Center, San Jacinto Mountains, California, USA
 Lake Hemet, State Highway 74, San Bernardino National Forest, California, USA

Soundtrack
 "There's A Gold Mine in the Sky" (Charles Kenny, Nick Kenny) by Gene Autry and Cowhands
 "Hummin' When We're Comin' Round the Bend" (Eddie Cherkose, Alberto Colombo) by Gene Autry, Smiley Burnette, Fred 'Snowflake' Toones, Jack Kirk and Cowhands
 "There's No Place Like Home (Home, Sweet Home)" (H.R. Bishop, John Howard Payne) by Smiley Burnette (a cappella) and Helen Ainsworth (whistling)
 "That's How Donkeys Were Born" (Eddie Cherkose, Smiley Burnette) by Smiley Burnette, Frankie Marvin, and J.L. Franks' Golden West Cowboys
 "Frühlingslied (Spring Song) Op.62 #6" (Felix Mendelssohn-Bartholdy) by The Stafford Sisters
 "Dude Ranch Cowhands" (Gene Autry, Fred Rose, Johnny Marvin) by Gene Autry, Smiley Burnette, The Stafford Sisters, and J.L. Franks' Golden West Cowboys
 "I'd Love to Call You My Sweetheart" (Joe Goodwin, Larry Shay, Paul Ash) by Gene Autry
 "Hike Yaa Move Along" (Smiley Burnette) by Gene Autry, Smiley Burnette, and Cowhands
 "Tumbleweed Tenor" (Eddie Cherkose, Smiley Burnette) by Smiley Burnette, Frankie Marvin, and J.L. Franks' Golden West Cowboys
 "As Long as I Have My Horse" (Gene Autry, Fred Rose, Johnny Marvin) by Gene Autry

References
Citations

Bibliography

External links
 
 
 

1938 films
1938 Western (genre) films
American Western (genre) films
Films directed by Joseph Kane
Republic Pictures films
American black-and-white films
1930s English-language films
1930s American films